Gazanfer Bilge (July 23, 1924 – April 20, 2008) was a Turkish sports wrestler who won the gold medal in the Featherweight class of Men's Freestyle Wrestling at the 1948 Olympics.

Biography
Gazanfer Bilge was born July 23, 1924 in Karamürsel, Kocaeli. He began wrestling in his age of 17, and was admitted to the national team during his military service. After winning the European champion title, he became the first Olympic gold medalist for Turkey in freestyle wrestling in London, England.

Gazanfer Bilge retired in 1953 from active sports after his exclusion from participation at the Helsinki Olympics in 1952. The International Fair Play Committee (CIFP) in Paris, France honored him with the "2002 Public relations - Service to Sports and Community Trophy".

Gazanfer Bilge also owned a large overland coach business. He donated to the town where he was born and grown up a primary school for hearing-impaired students, a vocational school for physical education and sports at Kocaeli University, an orphanage and a building for homeless people. He also supported many young wrestlers and students with scholarships. A sports hall located in Büyükçekmece, Istanbul, opened in August 2006, is named after him as well. In 1963 Bilge was imprisoned for a year after he shot fellow Olympian Adil Atan.

He was married and had a son named Muzaffer Bilge.

Achievements
1946 European Wrestling Championships in Stockholm, Sweden - gold
1948 Olympics - gold

Death
Gazanfer Bilge died on April 20, 2008 in Istanbul due to complications related to his liver.

Notes

References
Olympics Database
Who is who

External links
 

1924 births
People from Karamürsel
Olympic wrestlers of Turkey
Wrestlers at the 1948 Summer Olympics
Turkish male sport wrestlers
Olympic gold medalists for Turkey
Turkish people of Circassian descent
2008 deaths
Olympic medalists in wrestling
Medalists at the 1948 Summer Olympics